Caterpillar is a best-of compilation by pop rock singer Elisa, mainly aimed at the international market. It's an international, revisited edition of Soundtrack '96-'06 and it has been published in Italy, Germany, Austria, Switzerland, the Netherlands and Luxembourg.

Track listing
All lyrics written by Elisa except where noted; all music composed by Elisa except where noted.

Personnel 

 Fausto Anzelmo – Viola
 Glen Ballard – Producer
 Jay Blakesberg – Photography
 Massimo Bonano – Vocals (background)
 Paolo Buonvino – Piano, Arranger, Producer, String Director, String Writing
 Scott Campbell – Engineer
 Matt Chamberlain – Drums
 Andrew Duckles – Viola
 Donald Ferrone – Bass
 Andrea Fontana – Arranger, Drums
 David Frazer – Engineer, Mixing
 Max Gelsi – Bass, Arranger, Bass (Electric)
 Maurice Grants – Celli
 Paula Hochhalter – Celli
 Suzie Katayama – String Arrangements, String Conductor
 Randy Kerber – Piano
 Billy Konkel – Assistant
 William Malina – Engineer
 Frank Gayer Martin – Conductor, Orchestration, Transcription
 Kevin Mills – Assistant Engineer
 Pasquale Minieri – Producer
 Lance Morrison – Bass
 Enrique Gonzalez Müller – Assistant
 Giorgio Pacorig – Piano
 Fabrizio Palma – Choir Conductor
 Rocco Petruzzi – Arranger, Producer
 Tim Pierce – Guitar
 Luca Pincini – Cello
 Michele Richards – Violin
 Benny Rietveld – Bass
 Devon Rietveld – Engineer, Mixing
 Christian Rigano – Arranger
 Corrado Rustici – Flute, Guitar, Arranger, Guitar (Electric), Keyboards, Organ (Hammond), Programming, Guitar (12 String), Producer, E-Bow, String Arrangements, Treatments
 Turtle Island String Quartet – Strings
 Michael Urbano – Drums
 Mark Valentine – Assistant Engineer
 Josephina Vergara – Violin

Chart performance

References

Elisa (Italian singer) compilation albums
2007 greatest hits albums
Universal Records compilation albums